Heizhu Valley (literally "The Black Bamboo Valley") is a popular tourist attraction, located in Sichuan Province in southwest China. It occupies about 180 km2, bridging the Sichuan Basin and West Sichuan Plateau. The tourist business is maintained by Sichuan Heizhu Group Tourist Development Co., Ltd.

External links
Official site of Heizhu Group Tourist Development Co., Ltd. 
Heizhu Valley - China's Bermuda

Valleys of China
Landforms of Sichuan